Jerzy Tracz (born 10 February 1943) is a Polish former freestyle swimmer. He competed in two events at the 1960 Summer Olympics.

References

External links
 

1943 births
Living people
Polish male freestyle swimmers
Olympic swimmers of Poland
Swimmers at the 1960 Summer Olympics
People from Ostrowiec County
20th-century Polish people